"Wars" is a song by American rock band Hurt. The song was released as the lead single from the band's fifth studio album Goodbye to the Machine. "Wars" peaked at no. 20 on the Billboard Mainstream Rock Songs chart, staying on the chart for 20 weeks.

Reception
AllMusic reviewer Greg Prato favorably compared J. Loren Wince's vocals to Scott Stapp while comparing the music to Tool.

Track listing

Personnel
 J. Loren Wince – vocals, guitar, piano
 Paul Spatola – guitar, keyboards
 Rek Mohr – bass
 Louie Sciancalepore – drums, percussion

References

Hurt (band) songs
2009 songs
2009 singles